The Men's kumite +75 kg competition in Karate at the 2020 Summer Olympics was held on 7 August 2021 at the Nippon Budokan.

Competition format
The competition began with a two-pool round-robin stage followed by a single elimination stage. Each pool consisted of five athletes, with those positioned 1st and 4th seeded to Pool A, and those positioned 2nd and 3rd to Pool B. The athlete that finished first in Pool A faced the athlete that finished second in Pool B in the semifinals, and vice versa. There were no bronze medal matches in the kumite events. Losers of the semifinals each received a bronze medal.

Schedule 
All times are in local time (UTC+9).

Results

Pool stage
Pool A

Pool B

Finals

Reaction
The final bout of the men’s over-75 kilogram kumite was interrupted after the Iranian athlete Sajjad Ganjzadeh was knocked out by his opponent from Saudi Arabia Tareg Hamedi.
The judges decision to disqualify Hamedi and crown Ganjzadeh as champion sparked strong reactions around the karate world, such as Karate Combat chief Adam Kovacs calling the bout "robbed", while others pointed out a deeper division and one-sided attacks from other karate organizations.

Notes

References

External links
Seeding and competition format
 Complete Results book of Karate Event in Tokyo 2020 Olympic Games 

Karate at the 2020 Summer Olympics
Men's events at the 2020 Summer Olympics